The Ocensa pipeline (Oleoducto Central) is a crude oil pipeline in Colombia.  It starts on the Cusiana and Cupiagua oilfields and runs to  Coveñas on Colombia's Caribbean coastline. It is owned by the consortium of Ecopetrol, BP, Total S.A., Petrominerales and Triton Colombia.

Technical description 

Stations 
The oil pipeline counts with the following pumping stations (info updated in 2017):
 Cupiagua Station - 00
 Cusiana Station - 01
 El Porvenir Station - 02
 Páez Station - 03
 Miraflores Station - 04
 La Belleza Station - 05
 Vasconia Station - 06
 Chiquillo Station - 07
 Caucasia Station - 08
 Granjita Station - 09
 Coveñas Termina - 10

Partnerships 

See also 
 Caño Limón – Coveñas pipeline

References 

Oil pipelines in Colombia
BP buildings and structures
Buildings and structures in Antioquia Department
Buildings and structures in Boyacá Department
Buildings and structures in Córdoba Department
Buildings and structures in Cundinamarca Department